Margarete Hoenerbach (September 19, 1848 Cologne -Deutz; † 1924 in Berlin) was a German painter, graphic artist, medalist, and sculptor.

Life 
Margarete Hoenerbach trained privately with Otto Rethel and Alfred Hertel in Düsseldorf and settled in Berlin after stays in Paris and Italy. She initially devoted herself to portrait, still life, and landscape painting.

In 1868 the drawing and painting school of the Verein der Berliner Künstlerinnen was founded as the first public institution where women received basic and systematic artistic training in art. Women were not admitted to the art academy until 1919. In 1891, the association and the drawing and painting school established themselves as permanent institutions within the Berlin art scene with generous subsidies from the Prussian Ministry of Education. The Secessionists Philipp Franck, Hans Baluschek, Ludwig Dettmann, Martin Brandenburg, Ulrich Hübner, George Mosson, and Franz Skarbina was connected to the artists' association as a teacher at the drawing and painting school and as an honorary member.

Margarete Hoenerbach was appointed director from 1892 to 1909. Well-known students included Paula Modersohn-Becker in 1896, Ilse Jonas until 1909 and lecturers Jacob Alberts, Curt Stoeving , Martin Körte, Ernst Friedrich Hausmann, Ludwig Dettmann, Max Uth, Jeanna Bauck, and in 1897 Käthe Kollwitz.

From 1887 to 1911 she was represented with her work in the annual exhibitions of the Berlin Academy and in Munich. In the Allgemeine Kunstchronik Wien, Franz Hermann commented on her contribution to the 12th exhibition of the Association of Female Artists and Art Friends in 1890 in the Royal Academy building in Berlin:“A 'garden hall decoration' by Marg. Hönerbach suffers from overly strong emphasis on the decorative, whose great talent is revealed without contradiction in a miniature panel 'Vorrathskammer' that was also given. What Fraulein Hönerbach offers us in this barely hand-sized frame is incomparably higher than the gigantic proportions of the first picture of her. In this unpretentious little corner, executed in the finest way, there is a distribution of light, a solution of color contrasts, an atmosphere that all in all has a delightful effect.”In 1900 Hoenerbach participated with five pictures at the "Woman's Exhibition, 1900, Earl's Court, London, SW" with the address in Zehlendorf, Potsdamer Straße 39. In 1911, at the same address in the exhibition house , Potsdamerstraße 39, first Berlin jury-free exhibition: “You can also see good sculptures of women, they are based on Minne and Maillol, but still have their own life. The portrait study by Margarete Hoenerbach is excellent, [...]" ( Der Sturm) 

An eye ailment led her from painting and graphics to sculpture. For the Technical University of Berlin she created the monument to the rector Guido Hauck and his tomb.

Works 

 In vino veritas (ram's skull with stuffed roemer, roses and grapes), 1886.
 Blessed are the pure in heart , oil on canvas, 72 × 58 cm; sign.ur: M. Hoenerbach 1896 (art trade 1987).

See also 

 List of female sculptors

Literature 

 The week. Berlin, Jan./March 1900 (2.1), no. 11, p. 470: studio photo.
 Adolf Bothe (ed.): Address Book of Visual Artists. Born 1901. Munich 1901: “Berlin, Potsdamerstr. 39, garden shed.”
 Hoenerbach, Margarete. In: Friedrich von Boetticher: Painting works of the 19th century. contribution to art history. Volume 1/2, sheet 31-61: Heideck-Mayer, Louis. Mrs. v. Boetticher's Verlag, Dresden 1895, p. 568 ( text archive - Internet Archive ).
 General Administration of the Royal Museums in Berlin (ed.): Art Handbook for Germany. Directory of authorities, collections, educational institutions and associations for art, applied arts and archeology. 6th edition. Georg Reimer, Berlin 1904.
 Dressler's Art Handbook . 1907
 Hans Vollmer (ed.): Founded by Ulrich Thieme and Felix Becker . tape 17 : Heubel–Hubard . EA Seemann, Leipzig 1924, p. 209 .
 Hans Paffrath , Kunstmuseum Düsseldorf (ed.): Encyclopedia of the Düsseldorf school of painting. Volume 2, Bruckmann, Munich 1998, ISBN 3-7654-3010-2 , appendix.
 M. Heidemann: Medal art in Germany from 1895 to 1914. In: The art medal in Germany. 8, 1998, p. 499.
 First index of etchings, lithographs and woodcuts by modern graphic artists. R. Piper & Co. sales office for graphics, Munich 1904, p. 32 ( text archive - Internet Archive ).

Web Links 
Commons : Margarete Hoenerbach  - Collection of images, videos and audio files

 numispedia.de

References 

 ↑ Association of Berlin Artists 1867 e. V., club chronicle: drawing & painting school ( memento of the original from July 17, 2015 in the Internet Archive ) Info: The archive link was inserted automatically and has not yet been checked. Please check the original and archive link according to the instructions and then remove this notice. , retrieved June 18, 2015. 
 ↑ Berlin, February 3, 1890. In: Allgemeine Kunstchronik. Vienna, 14th year, 1890, p. 129 ff.
 ↑ Woman's Exhibition, 1900, Earl's Court, London, SW Official fine art, historical and general catalog p. 235 (English, text archive - Internet Archive ).
 ↑ The Storm. Volume 2, #82, October 21, 1911 ( princeton.edu ).
 ↑ Lutz Ruffert: Medals Berlin: 1725 - 2009. Catalogue, H. Gietel Verlag, 2009, p. 33 "Coin Guido Hauck , design Margarete Hoenerbach".

19th-century German painters
German sculptors
German women painters
1848 births
1924 deaths